Super Greg is a fictional DJ created by copywriter Linus Karlsson and creative director Paul Malmström for the Minneapolis advertising agency Fallon McElligott as part of a viral marketing campaign for American jeans company, Lee Jeans in 1999. The campaign launched with a one-page website (www.supergreg.com) and culminated in a TV commercial where Super Greg has a showdown with Lee's mascot, Buddy Lee.

Super Greg was portrayed by Sacha Baron Cohen. Super Greg might have contained inspirational elements in creating his next persona, Ali G.

Super Greg was a site in a set of 3 sites, they were: 

 Super Greg, Concept Site
 Curry, Rubberburner
 Roy, Born to Destroy

They were all teasers for a campaign for Lee Jeans. After the campaign the sites directed to Lee Jeans.

References

External links
 Mirror of the original Super Greg page
 Graveyard of Hoax sites
 A tribute site with a collection of fan spin offs

Clothing advertising characters
Male characters in advertising
Fictional characters introduced in 1999